

The Clutton-Tabenor Easy Too (originally the E.C.2) was a small homebuilt aircraft under development in the United Kingdom in the late 1970s. It was intended to be a flying showcase for designer Eric Clutton's adaptation of the Volkswagen air-cooled engine as a geared aero-engine. The lines of the aircraft were influenced by the Percival Mew Gull racer of the 1930s, but it was to have retractable undercarriage. The wings were designed to be folded to allow the aircraft to be towed behind a car.

Work on the prototype was abandoned when Clutton emigrated to the United States and the Easy Too never flew.

Specifications (as designed)

References

See also

1970s British sport aircraft 
Homebuilt aircraft
Low-wing aircraft
Single-engined tractor aircraft
Easy Too